Rudd's apalis (Apalis ruddi) is a species of bird in the family Cisticolidae.
It is found primarily in Mozambique but also in southern Malawi and adjacent areas of South Africa and Eswatini.
Its natural habitats are subtropical or tropical dry forest and subtropical or tropical moist shrubland.

References

External links
 Rudd's apalis - Species text in The Atlas of Southern African Birds.

Rudd's apalis
Birds of East Africa
Vertebrates of Mozambique
Rudd's apalis
Taxonomy articles created by Polbot